Butterglory was an American indie rock band from Lawrence, Kansas. Contemporaries of indie rock groups like Pavement and Archers of Loaf, the band released four albums with Merge Records.

History
Composed of Matt Suggs and Debby Vander Wall, the band began in 1992 with the release of Alexander Bends EP. They later joined Merge Records and released their first album Crumble in 1994. This was followed by a collection of singles, Downed in 1995. Adding bassist Stephen Naron and a variety of other musicians, the group released the more developed Are You Building a Temple in Heaven?. The group's final record, Rat Tat Tat was released on Merge Records in 1997.

Matt Suggs now plays with White Whale.

Discography
LPS
Crumble (1994)
Are You Building a Temple in Heaven? (1996)
Rat Tat Tat (1997)
Compilations
Downed (1995)

References

Indie rock musical groups from Kansas
Musicians from Lawrence, Kansas
Merge Records artists
1992 establishments in Kansas
Musical groups established in 1992
Musical groups disestablished in 1997